"Among My Souvenirs" is a 1927 song with words by Edgar Leslie and music by Horatio Nicholls (pseudonym of British composer Frederick Lawrence Wright).

Original version

The earliest known version of "Among My Souvenirs" was recorded by The Kit-Cat Band on September 19, 1927. It was first a number one chart hit for Paul Whiteman in 1928. Whiteman's recording was recorded November 22, 1927, and released by Victor Records as catalog number 35877A.

In Lullaby of Broadway, by Patricia Dubin McGuire (Secaucus NJ: Citadel Press, 1983) it is stated that Al Dubin sold the song to Edgar Leslie for $25 (page 94).

Other charting versions

In 1959, Connie Francis recorded the song peaking at number seven on the Hot 100.  The Connie Francis version also peaked at number ten on the R&B charts.  In the United Kingdom, the song reached #11.  Her version was arranged by Ray Ellis.
In 1976, Marty Robbins had his 16th and last number one on the country charts with his version of the song.

Additional versions
Over the years, the song has been covered by many artists including:

Louis Armstrong (Decca catalog number 4327A, recorded April 17, 1942, with the flip side "Coquette")
Bing Crosby and Russ Morgan's Orchestra (Decca catalog number 23745A, recorded August 22, 1946,  with the flip side "Does Your Heart Beat for Me?")
Judy Garland (recorded for Capitol Records in February or March, 1957)
Bob Haring and the Regent Club Orchestra (Brunswick catalog number 3723, recorded November 14, 1927, with the flip side "The Song Is Ended")
Eddy Howard (Columbia catalog number 35949, recorded June 28, 1940, with the flip side "Tonight You Belong to Me")
Roger Wolfe Kahn (Released 6 January 1928)
James Melton (Columbia catalog number 1238D, recorded December 14, 1927, with the flip side "Dear, on a Night like This")
Alvino Rey and his Orchestra (Capitol catalog number 338, recorded 1946, with the flip side "Save Your Sorrow")
Ben Selvin and his Orchestra (Columbia catalog number 1188D, recorded October 1927, with the flip side "Dream Kisses" by The Ipana Troubadours)
Frank Sinatra (Columbia catalog number 37161, recorded July 1946, with the flip side "September Song")
Paul Weston and his Orchestra  (Columbia catalog number 39509, with the flip side "Moon Song")
Hoagy Carmichael plays it on the piano, as Milly and Al Stephenson dance, in the 1946 film The Best Years of Our Lives.
Joni James on her album Among My Souvenirs (MGM, 1957)
Hank Snow on his album Country & Western Jamboree (RCA Victor, 1957)
Marie Osmond on her album Who's Sorry Now (MGM, 1975)
Ray Price on his posthumous farewell album Beauty Is... Ray Price: The Final Sessions (Amerimonte, 2014)

In popular culture
The song is referenced by the Frederic March character, Al Stephenson, in the film The Best Years of Our Lives (1946). He requests the song and he and the Myrna Loy character, Milly Stephenson, dance to it as played by Hoagy Carmichael on the piano, at Butch's Bar. The music is developed in the movie's orchestral score by Hugo Friedhofer.

The song is referenced in the 2021 play Among My Souvenirs by Alex Margo Arden and Caspar Heinemann. It first premiered in Malmö on 22 August 2021 for World Pride and was performed at Barnens Scen, Malmö Folkets Park.

See also
See Laura Weber White for her 2003 solo album "Among My Souvenirs".

References

1927 songs
1959 singles
1976 singles
Songs written by Edgar Leslie
Marty Robbins songs
Connie Francis songs
Judy Garland songs
Columbia Records singles
MGM Records singles
Torch songs
Songs with music by Lawrence Wright (composer)